Andrea H. Japp, born on September 17, 1957, is a French scientist and author. \Japp is best known for her Kit Salinger series of crime novels, which follow the exploits of a New York City private investigator. Born in France, Japp has also lived in Switzerland, England, and the United States. She currently resides in Paris. In addition to her popular mystery series, Japp has also written a number of standalone novels, including The Scent of Blue (2000) and The Promise of Water (2002).

She is considered as one of the queens of crime fiction writing in France. She has contributed to various genres such as suspense, thriller, history and so on. She is also the French translator of Patricia Cornwell's novels featuring the character of Kay Scarpetta.

Andrea did her graduate studies in Paris and Boston. She has a doctorate in biochemistry. She trained in Toxicology at MIT and obtained a diploma in bacteriology from the Institut Pasteur.

In 1991, she published her first detective novel, La Bostonienne, which won the detective novel award at the Festival du Film Policier de Cognac.

In 1998, she was a member of the Festival du Film Policier de Cognac. In 1999, she created the “Black Roots” collection at Le Masque, where she published among other authors such as Brigitte Aubert, Maud Tabachnik, Patrick Raynal. She is also an author of TV dramas and comics, and writes for children.

As a child, Japp loved to read detective stories, a passion that would eventually lead her to write her own mysteries. In an interview with Publishers Weekly, she recalled: "I was really fascinated by these American [private detectives].

References

French crime fiction writers
French biochemists
Massachusetts Institute of Technology School of Science alumni
Living people
French women novelists
1957 births